Ukholovsky District is an administrative and municipal district (raion), one of the twenty-five in Ryazan Oblast, Russia. It is located in the south of the oblast. Its administrative center is the urban locality (a work settlement) of Ukholovo. Population: 9,532 (2010 Census);  The population of Ukholovo accounts for 52.1% of the district's total population.

References

Notes

Sources

Districts of Ryazan Oblast